Eradi is a subgroup of the Samantan Nair caste from the Indian state of Kerala. The Samoothiri (Zamorins), the monarchs and hereditary rulers of the kingdom of Kozhikode, belong to this subcaste.

See also
Justice V. Balakrishna Eradi
Nair

References

Kerala society
Indian castes